Paola Lettieri  is a British-Italian chemical engineer who is a Professor and Director of UCL East at University College London. Her research considers fluidisation and life-cycle assessment. She has developed novel, sustainable fluid-bed processes.

Early life and education 
Lettieri is from Italy. She attended the Sapienza University of Rome, where she graduated Laurea in 1994. Lettieri then moved to the United Kingdom, where she completed graduate research at University College London. Her research considered the impact of temperature flow behaviour in a gas fluidised bed. After graduating Lettieri joined BP Chemicals.

Research and career 
In 2001, Lettieri joined the Chemical Engineering faculty at University College London. On starting her academic career she was funded by a research fellowship from the Royal Academy of Engineering, and was the first woman engineer to be awarded such an honour. She was elected a Fellow of the Institution of Chemical Engineers in 2007.

Lettieri's research considers fluidisation and life-cycle assessment. She was initially interested in waste gasification. She worked with Advanced Plasma Power on the combination of gasification and plasma conversion, producing a versatile synthetic gas from its waste. The process collects waste, separates metals, plastic and glass and converts it into refuse-derived fuels. When these refuse-derived fuels are pumped into the gasifier vessel, synthetic gas in produced. The gas, which is composed of carbon monoxide, carbon dioxide, hydrogen and steam, is passed through a plasma converter. The resulting gas can be used for heating and electricity generation.

At University College London, Lettieri worked as Vice Dean of Strategic Projects. In that capacity, she oversaw the development of UCL East in the Queen Elizabeth Olympic Park. In 2021 Lettieri was elected a Fellow of the Royal Academy of Engineering.

Selected publications

References 

Fellows of the Royal Academy of Engineering
Female Fellows of the Royal Academy of Engineering
Fellows of the Institution of Chemical Engineers
Living people
Italian women
Italian chemical engineers
Year of birth missing (living people)